Franklyn Bonn Sanders (March 8, 1949 – February 17, 2012) was a professional ice hockey player who made 76 regular season game appearances for the WHA Minnesota Fighting Saints in 1972–73. Born in Oakdale, Minnesota, he is perhaps best known for being a member of the United States hockey team that won a silver medal in the 1972 Olympic Winter Games in Sapporo, Japan. Sanders also played on the 1969 WCHA champion Minnesota Gophers hockey team and was captain of the 1970–71 team. He was awarded the John Mariucci Most Valuable Player Award that year.

After turning down an offer by the Boston Bruins in order to play for the Olympics, Sanders was later signed by his hometown team, the Minnesota Fighting Saints. The Saints were a charter member of the upstart World Hockey Association, a professional league that was challenging the NHL hockey empire.

Sanders was a big (6'3 230 lbs), intimidating defenseman and was known for his tough play and fighting ability. At the end of his first season he unexpectedly quit playing hockey to pursue life in the ministry. Until his death he was pastor at Spirit of Life Bible Church in Woodbury, Minnesota.

In November 2011, he published his autobiography titled From Silver to Gold in which he tells of about his experiences playing hockey and his sudden decision to walk away from his pro career. He died in Woodbury, Minnesota in February 2012.

References 
 
 Frank Sanders' obituary

1949 births
2012 deaths
American men's ice hockey defensemen
Ice hockey players from Minnesota
Ice hockey players at the 1972 Winter Olympics
Medalists at the 1972 Winter Olympics
Minnesota Fighting Saints players
Minnesota Golden Gophers men's ice hockey players
Olympic silver medalists for the United States in ice hockey
People from Oakdale, Minnesota